Conda is an unincorporated community in Caribou County, Idaho, United States. Conda has a post office with ZIP code 83230.

History
Conda's population was estimated at 200 in 1960.

Climate
This climatic region is typified by large seasonal temperature differences, with warm to hot (and often humid) summers and cold (sometimes severely cold) winter.  According to the Köppen Climate Classification system, Conda has a humid continental climate, abbreviated "Dfb" on climate maps.

References

Unincorporated communities in Caribou County, Idaho
Unincorporated communities in Idaho